Qianyao railway station is a railway station belonging to Jilin–Shulan Railway and located in the Longtan District of Jilin, Jilin province, China.

See also
Jilin–Shulan Railway

References

Railway stations in Jilin